Piha Rescue is a New Zealand reality series following the daily actions of the Piha Surf Life Saving Club lifeguards on Piha surf beach, one of the country's most popular beaches. Piha is one of the many beaches located on the North Island West Coast near Auckland.

Filming commenced on Piha Rescue for the first time in the summer of 2001, followed by a one-hour documentary airing in December 2002 (aired as Piha Patrol). It was the first reality show in the world following lifeguards.

In 2003 the first series screened on Television New Zealand followed by a further ten; with the final (12th) series screened on Prime in 2016 and 2017. Screened in New Zealand as Piha Rescue, it has also been sold around the world under various titles, such as Deadly Surf and Surf Rescue. As of May 2019 it currently airs on Freeview Channel ThreeLife, generally on Sundays at 7 PM.

External links
 Piha Surf Life Saving Club web site

See also
Bondi Rescue

References

New Zealand reality television series
Lifesaving in New Zealand
TVNZ original programming
Prime (New Zealand TV channel) original programming
Surfing in New Zealand
2001 New Zealand television series debuts
2003 New Zealand television series debuts
2017 New Zealand television series endings
Surf lifesaving